Satara (ISO: Sātārā) is a city located in the Satara District of Maharashtra state of India, near the confluence of the river Krishna and its tributary, the Venna. The city was established in the 16th century and was the seat of the Chhatrapati of Maratha Empire, Shahu I. It is the headquarters of Satara Tehsil, as well as the Satara District. The city gets its name from the seven forts (Sat-Tara) which are around the city. The city is known as a Soldier's city as well as Pensioner's city.

History
The first Muslim ruling of the Deccan took place in 1296. In 1636, the Nizam Shahi dynasty came to an end. In 1663, Chattrapati Shivaji conquered Parali and Satara fort. After the death of Shivaji, Shahu Shivaji, heir apparent to the Maratha Empire, captured by Mughals when he was only seven years old, remained their prisoner till the death of his father in 1700. The Dowager Maharani Tarabai proclaimed his younger half-brother, and her son, Shahu Sambhaji as Chhatrapati Maharaj under her regency. Mughals released Shahu under certain preconditions in 1707, so that Marathas would face an internal war for the throne. Shahu returned to the Maratha Empire and claimed his inheritance. Aurangzeb's son Muhammad Azam Shah conquered Satara fort Ajinkyatara after a 6-month siege, later won by Parshuram Pratinidhi in 1706. In 1708, Chattrapati Shahu, the son of Chattrapati Sambhaji, was crowned at the Satara fort. The direct descendants of Chattrapati Shivaji continue to live in Satara. Chattrapati Udayanraje Bhonsle is the 13th descendant of Shivaji.

Shadow government was established during Quit India movement in Satara.

Geography 

It lies in the Satara District. Satara city is surrounded by seven mountains. Satara lies on the slope of Ajinkyatara fort. It lies on the western side of the Deccan Plateau. Pune , Sangli , Kolhapur and Solapur are the main cities close to Satara. The city is surrounded by the tehsils of Koregaon on the West, Karad and Patan on the South, Jawali on the East and Wai on the North.

Khatgun is the oldest village in Satara district residing on the banks of river Yerala. It is one of the historic village in Khatav Taluka with LAWAND clan from many years residing here. The Lawand family belongs to the 96 Kuli Maratha clan. Khatgun is considered to be the native of Lawand clan from all over India. Khatgun is also famous for Raje Bagsavar Dargha, which is one of the historic Dargha's of Satara district and one of the oldest in the world. It is said that many kings have visited Khatgun Dargha in the 16th century. The Dargha is very famous for Hindu-Muslim unity as both the community people workship together. The daily pooja is performed my Lawand family which is a Hindu family. In the 17th century devotees from Afghanistan and various other Arabic countries use to visit Khatgun Dargha. Khatgun Dargha is very unique as you would find many small temples inside the premises of the Dargha.

National Highway 48 (formerly National Highway 4) passes through Satara,  between Karad and Khandala.  Kaas Plateau, a valley of flowers, is situated 25 km away from Satara .

The Satara District experiences earthquakes of minor magnitudes. the epicenter of these earthquakes are scattered in Patan Taluka.

Satara is famous for the Kaas Plateau, Thoseghar, and a lot of natural sites present in the vicinity of the city. Kass Plateau has been awarded as a UNESCO's World Heritage Site (WHS). In the monsoon months, the Kaas Pathar, as it is locally known, transforms into a wildflower wonderland. More particularly so in September when vivid shades of pink balsams, yellow Smithia flowers, and blue utricularias carpet the vast grasslands. It’s a must-visit for serious botanists, amateur photographers to witness the spectrum of Western Ghats monsoon montane grasslands flora, some of which are rare and endangered.

Climate
Satara city has a tropical wet and dry climate (Köppen climate classification: Aw) that is influenced by the relatively high altitude and mountains surrounding the city. Summers are more hot than the winters. Satara city receives rainfall from 900 mm to 1,500 mm depending on the strength of the monsoon.

Demographics
As of 2011 India census, Satara had a population of 120,079; 61,129 are males while 59,066 are females, thus males constituted 52% of the population and females 48%. Satara has an average literacy rate of 80%, higher than the national average of 74%: male literacy is 84%, and female literacy is 76%. In Satara, 10% of the population is under 6 years of age. Marathi is the native and most widely spoken language. Hindi is spoken by 1.5% of the population.

Maharashtra state's sex ratio is 883 girls per 1000 boys, and Satara fares worse still at 881, in spite of the high level of literacy.

The population of Satara has crossed the municipal limits and actual urban agglomerate population 326,765. The city is surrounded with census towns viz. Pratikash B. Karanje, Khed, Godoli and Vilaspur. These census towns are considered as suburban of Satara city.

The nod for Satara city, 
limit expansion was given by Devendra Fadnavis then chief minister of Maharashtra on 16 September 2019. The matter was pending for 40 years.
The city's border will be extended to NH4 towards east, to Ajinkyatara on the south, the whole region south to Venna River, Shahupuri, Sambhajinagar, Vilaspur and Dare Budruk grampanchayats will become a part of Satara city.

Government and politics 
Satara city falls under Satara Lok Sabha constituency, represented by MP Shriniwas Patil from the Nationalist Congress Party. The city also elects an MLA from the Satara Vidhan Sabha constituency, represented by BJP's Shivendrasinh Abhayasinh Bhosale.

Civic administration 
Satara is a Municipal Council city in district of Satara, Maharashtra. Satara Municipal Council, with population of about 1.2 lakh is Satara sub district's only municipal council located in Satara sub district of Satara district in the state Maharashtra in India. Total geographical area of Satara municipal council is 8 square km. Population density of the city is 14748 persons per square km.

The Satara city is divided into 39 wards for which elections are held every 5 years. Among them Satara Ward No 19 is the most populous ward with population of 4691 and Satara Ward No 23 is the least populous ward with population of 2206.

Civic utilities 
Water from the Kaas lake is supplied to Satara city for drinking purposes. Maharashtra Jeevan Pradhikaran supplies water to Satara city. 19 MLD is supplied , but because of water leakage during transmission, only 17.2 MLD gets supplied effectively.

Satara Municipal Council is responsible for providing sanitation and solid waste management services in the city, through private contractors. 70 MT/day of solid waste is generated per day. 18 Mt/ day is disposed off through composting. 8.17 sq km of the city, covering 20972 households, are covered under door to door collection.

12.8 MLD of sewage is generated in the city. Satara Municipal Council has plans to construct an STP of 17.5 MLD capacity.

The Maharashtra Right to Public Service Act, 2015 is a revolutionary Act. Citizens can get complete information regarding which services are available under this Act by accessing either the mobile app RTS Maharashtra or ‘Aaple Sarkar’ Web Portal. Citizens can even apply online for availing these services.

Economy 
Sugarcane is the single biggest crop of Satara along with turmeric and ginger. The Satara district has around 302 banks. The per capita of Satara district is nearly 1.2 times the state average. The British had, during the pre-Independence period started a variety of industries in Satara for Menthol and soap manufacturing in 1905. Bigger industries for copper were started in 1922. After independence, the whole district was stagnant in industrial growth. From 1950-60, industrial growth restarted and the manufacture of jaggery was started in the Satara Tehsil area. There is tanning industry in Satara city. It existed during the British rule, and after independence, the Maharashtra government established a modern tanning center in 1957.

Tourism

The famous tourist points near Satara city are:
Ajinkyatara Fort (अजिंक्यतारा किल्ला)
Jarandeshwar Hanuman - Satara Koregaon Road. 

Sajjangad Fort (सज्जनगड किल्ला)
Kaas Plateau – Called "Valley of flowers of Maharashtra" which is also a World Heritage Site
Baramotichi Vihir Step well, near Limb village which is about 16 km from Satara
Thoseghar Waterfall
Yewateshwar
Bamnoli
Dhom Dam
12 motichi vihir, limb
Raje Baksavar Peer Saaheb Dargha (Khatgun)
Chaphal (Shree Ram Mandir, Near Umbraj)

A sunset view from Naryan Maharaj Math, Bamnoli]]
Paratapgad located 75 km North West of Satara
The fort's historical significance is due to the Battle of Pratapgad, which took place here on 10 November 1659, between Chatrapti Shivaji and Bijapur Sultanate general Afzal Khan. Killing of Afzal Khan by Chatrapati Shivaji was followed by decisive Maratha victory over the Bijapur army.
Panchgani located 50 km from Satara. Panchgani, called Paachgani (पाचगणी in Marathi), is a hill station and municipal council in Satara district.

Culture

Places to visit 
Satara is located at foot of the famous Ajinkyatara fort. It is located on Kas plateau / Flower plateau, now a World Natural Heritage site. Satara has two palaces in the heart of the city, the Old Palace (Juna Rajwada) and the New Palace (Nava Rajwada) adjoining each other. The Old Palace was built around 300 years ago, and the New Palace was built about 200 years ago.

Satara has a unique statue of chatrapati Shivaji maharaj standing near a canon, at Powai Naka. Generally, a statue of Shivaji Maharaj has seen him riding the horse.

Thoseghar Waterfalls around 20  km west of Satara. It is one of the best monsoon tourist places in the Western Ghats. People come from all over Maharashtra to visit the falls, especially during the monsoon season between July and October. Vajrai Waterfall, India's highest waterfall, is around 22 km from Satara. And Sajjangad, around 15 km from Satara.

Satara hosts 'Satara Half Hill Marathon' each year. In 2015, they entered the Guinness World Records book for Most People in a Mountain Run (Single Mountain) with 2,618 runners.

Apshinge Military is a small village in Satara district but it has historical significance as at least one member of every family in the village has served or is serving in the armed forces. The contribution of the village was recognized by the British government, which installed a memorial in the village in the memory of 46 soldiers who laid down their lives fighting for Britain during World War I. Food

Satara is well known for its sweet: Kandi Pedhe. Kandi Pedhe is a special delicacy of Milk which is prepared by pure full-fat milk available in nearby villages. It has its natural richness and sweetness. Kandi pedha has its unique taste and is not sugar loaded like other pedhas available in the market.

Education 
Satara is well known for Sainik School, Satara - The first among the chains of Sainik Schools established in the country on 23 June 1961 under the Ministry of Defence.
Satara has base of Rayat education institutes.
Yashavantrao Chavan Institute of Science  is one of the famous institute from District.
Rayat Shikshan Sanstha's Karmaveer Bhaurao Patil college of engineering, Satara is the oldest engineering college in Satara city. Government Medical college start from year 2022. GMC (Government Medical College) Satara has first batch in the year 2022, it is located near the Civil Hospital Satara

KSD Shanbhag Vidyalaya (1990)
Government Medical College (2022)

Notable people 
 Shubham Nitin Shinde
 Jagannath Raoji Chitnis
 Sai Bhosale
 Yashwantrao Chavan
 Tanaji Malusare
 Rani of Jhansi
 Jyotirao Phule
 Bhaurao Patil
 Ajit G Lawand
 Krantisinha Nana Patil
 Khashaba Dadasaheb Jadhav
 Udayanraje Bhosale
 Narendra Dabholkar
 Shivendra Raje Bhosale
 Sayaji Shinde
 Surekha Yadav
 Lalita Babar
 Nikhil Anil Lawand
 Sharad Pawar
 Shahir Sable

Transport
Satara is about 250  km from Mumbai on National Highway 48 (via Mumbai Pune Expressway and PB road) & 110 km away from Pune. Train services from Chhatrapati Shivaji Maharaj Terminus railway station, Mumbai to Kolhapur , Miraj via Satara. Private travels and government state transport buses are available from Borivali, Dadar, Mumbai Central, and Thane to Satara.
Satara is around 110  km from Pune (Pune Airport is the nearest airport) by road.

Satara city is well connected with the rest of Maharashtra by road and rail. National Highway 48 a part of the Golden Quadrilateral running between Delhi and Chennai passes through Satara connecting Mumbai and Pune on north side and kolhapur on south side in Maharashtra. A bypass was constructed to avoid traffic congestion in the city. National Highway 965D connects Kedgaon, Supe, Morgaon, Nira, Lonand, Wathar up to Satara. National Highway 548C starts from Satara, Satara-Akluj-Latur Highway connects Satara city to Latur, it passes through Koregaon, Pusegaon, Mhaswad, Akluj, Tembhurni and Murud. It will also be a 4 lane highway, work is going to start soon. State Highway 58 connects Satara with Mahabaleshwar and Solapur.

Satara railway station lies on the Pune-Miraj line of the Central Railways and is administered by the Pune Railway Division. The railway station is located a small distance east of the city and is served by several express trains. Sahyadri Express, Koyna Express, Mahalaxmi Express, Maharashtra Express, Goa Express are daily trains that have stops at Satara. Satara Mahad Bankot is a newly declared national highway connecting  Satara to the Konkan region.

Railways

 Satara  – 7 km from city

Satara has railway station situated near Mahuli about 07 km distance on the Satara Pandharpur road from Satara Bus stand. Satara is On Route from Mumbai to Miraj, Sangli, Kolhapur, and Bangalore (some trains).
You can reach Satara from Mumbai or Pune easily by road or rail (Mahalaxmi Express, Koyna Express,"Goa Express", Chalukya Express).

 Railway Time Table Satara

Towards Miraj / Karad

Towards Pune

See also
 Bhosale
 Maratha
 Maratha Empire
 List of Maratha dynasties and states
 Peshwe
 Holkars

References

Further reading

 Paul H. von Tucher:  Nationalism: Case and crisis in Mission – German Missions in British India 1939 – 1946 Diss. Erlangen 1980. Author's edition Erlangen/Germany 1980. Read SATARA.
 Wilhelm Filchner: Life of a Researcher (chapter XXIII). Wilhelm Filchner was interned from September 1941 until November 1946 in the Parole Camp in Satara.
Selections from the Historical Records of the Hereditary Minister of Baroda. Consisting of letters from Bombay, Baroda, Poona and Satara Governments. Collected by B. A. Gupte. Calcutta 1922.
Malik, S. C. Stone Age Industries of the Bombay & Satara Districts, M. Sayajirao University Baroda 1959.
Irawati Karve, Jayant Sadashiv Randadive, The Social Dynamics of a Growing Town and Its Surrounding Area. Deccan College, 1965, Poona. ISBN B0000CQW3J
Valunjkar, T. N. Social Organization, Migration & Change in a Village Community, Deccan College Poona 1966.
 Dr. B.R.Ambedkar writes about his experience while living as a child in Satara in his autobiographical book, Waiting for a Visa 

 
Cities and towns in Satara district
Cities in Maharashtra